Tencent Weibo was a Chinese microblogging (weibo) website launched by Tencent in April 2010, and was shut down on September 28th, 2020. Users could broadcast a message including 140 Chinese characters at most through the web, SMS or smartphone.

Introduction
Tencent Weibo was a social network that connected all users together. It enhanced communication between friends. Users could share photos, videos and text with a 140-character limit. The reposting function of Tencent Weibo was similar to Twitter's "retweeting", which was replied in @ form. In comparison, Tencent Weibo encourages users to create new topics on their own. With the support of QQ, Tencent didn't intend to launch Tencent Weibo at a strategic level, but as a marketing tactic to curb competitors.

Some Chinese celebrities were Tencent Weibo users, including, Ma Huateng, Zhou Hongyi, Liu Xiang and Jet Li.

Features
Initially only QQ users could register Tencent Weibo account corresponding to their own QQ number. Weibo accounts were not automatically registered for QQ users, they needed to log into their Tencent Weibo page for registration. Email address could be used for registration (formerly only QQ email address were supported). Posts could be shortened into an url.cn domain name.  Each user could follow up to 2,000 people.  Through the QQ client (Windows Simplified Chinese version of the QQ2010 Beta 3 or later version), QQ Pinyin input method, computer, smartphone (iPhone, Android OS, S60, and KJava), SMS and MMS, users could broadcast microblogging messages. In addition, photos could be inserted in all form, except SMS. Also, users could add videos (Tencent Video) and songs (QQ Music).

History
Early in 2007, Tencent launched a microblogging-like website Taotao.com. However, due to some operating problems, on January 26, 2010, Tencent announced to shut down and merge the website into the Qzone. Later in March, Qoocu.com (a blog focusing on products of Tencent) released some screenshots of the internal beta test of Tencent Weibo. On April 1, Tencent began its public beta test, people with an invitation code might take part in the test. And on the same day, Tencent released its QQ2010 version Beta3, with the microblogging feature included. In the second quarter of 2012 it had 469 million registered users. On July 23, 2014, Tencent Inc announced that it will integrate its micro-blogging service's operation team into the company's news team, after media reported that it has dismissed its micro-blogging department and will stop upgrading its micro-blogging service. In September 2020, Tencent shut down their Weibo.

Developer platform
Tencent Weibo acted as an 'open' platform for developers and users to communicate and share data widely.  After signing on, developers and users could use the open API to create an application. Through the application, they could obtain information or spread new information.

References

External links
 t.qq.com: Tencent Weibo website

Tencent
Chinese social networking websites
Blog hosting services
Defunct microblogging services
Real-time web
2010 establishments in China
Internet properties established in 2010